Erkerode is a small village and a community in the District of Wolfenbüttel, in the south-east of Lower Saxony, Germany. The Elm, a range of forested hills, is close by.

The town of Erkerode was first mentioned in historic documents in 1175 (Erikeroth). The village belonged to the noble family of Veltheim since the 12th century. It was part of the court of Destedt. There are still many medieval farm houses of various types to be seen in the village today.

See also

References

External links

Wolfenbüttel (district)